Sheitan ("Devil" in Arabic) is a 2006 French horror film directed by debutant director Kim Chapiron. It was written by Kim and Christian Chapiron. It stars and was co-produced by Vincent Cassel. His then-wife Monica Bellucci makes a cameo appearance in the film.

Synopsis
A trio of friends partying at the club,  Ladj, Bart and Thaï, have decided to visit the country home of a woman they just met, Eve, after Bart is thrown out of the club. They take along with them another woman, Yasmin. Once in the country they are introduced to the eccentric housekeeper Joseph, whose behaviors disturb Bart. He grows more irate after an incident in a nearby hot spring, where he is thrown in by Joseph's sexually aggressive niece. Later that night Joseph tells them a story about a man who committed incest with his sister after being granted invulnerability by the devil. Upon discovering that she is pregnant, the devil tells the man that he must prepare a gift for the child. It is heavily implied by Joseph's mannerisms that he is telling a story about himself.

Throughout the day and night Joseph collects various items from Bart's person such as hair from his head and scraps of fabric from his clothing. He brings the items to a pregnant woman, who uses them to decorate a doll. Joseph later assaults Bart and his friends after they are pranked by his niece and other youths from the local town. Ladj and Thaï flee the home for the city, leaving Bart behind after he protests that they are leaving Yasmine behind. Bart returns to the home to find Yasmine and is attacked by Joseph, who is carrying a curved dollmaking tool.

Just as his eyes are about to be carved out Bart finds himself back at the club, surrounded by Ladj, Thaï, and Yasmine at the moment where he was thrown out of the club. They take him to the hospital since he had been struck by a bottle prior to having been evicted, where Bart experiences strange imagery. He awakens on the country home's floor, his eyes having been carved out and placed on a puppet. Joseph then takes the puppet to the pregnant woman, Marie, who has given birth and is surrounded by Eve, Joseph's niece, and a young man that had swum with them in the hot spring. He shows the puppet to the baby before he and the woman turn to the camera and smile, showing that they have identical features and implying that they are brother and sister.

Cast
 Vincent Cassel as Joseph/Marie
  as Bart
 Nico Le Phat Tan as Thaï
 Ladj Ly as Ladj
 Roxane Mesquida as Eve
 Leïla Bekhti as Yasmine
 Julie-Marie Parmentier as Jeanne
 François Levantal as The pumpman / surgeon

Reception 
The film holds a rating of 53% on review aggregator Rotten Tomatoes, based on 17 reviews.

References

External links
 Official Site (not active anymore)
 
 
 Soundtrack

2000s Christmas horror films
2006 films
2006 horror films
2000s French-language films
French Christmas horror films
Films about Satanism
2000s French films